The 2012 Atlantic 10 Men's Soccer Tournament was the seventeenth edition of the tournament. The tournament decided the Atlantic 10 Conference champion for the 2012 season and guaranteed representative into the 2012 NCAA Division I Men's Soccer Championship. The tournament will be held from November 8–11.

Qualification

Bracket

Schedule

Quarterfinals

Semifinals

A-10 Championship

Statistical leaders

See also 
 Atlantic 10 Conference
 2012 Atlantic 10 Conference men's soccer season
 2012 NCAA Division I men's soccer season
 2012 NCAA Division I Men's Soccer Championship

References 

Atlantic 10 Men's Soccer Tournament
Atlantic 10 Men's Soccer Tournament